Glenn Emanuel Ressler (born May 21, 1943) is a former National Football League offensive lineman from 1965 through 1974. During that span he appeared in Super Bowl III and was a member of the team that won Super Bowl V for the Baltimore Colts. He played college football at Penn State University.  He was drafted as the 36th pick in the 1965 NFL draft.  In 2001, he was inducted to the College Football Hall of Fame. He attended Mahanoy Joint High School in Herndon, Pennsylvania.

References

1943 births
Living people
People from Northumberland County, Pennsylvania
Players of American football from Pennsylvania
American football offensive linemen
Penn State Nittany Lions football players
All-American college football players
Maxwell Award winners
College Football Hall of Fame inductees
Baltimore Colts players